South West Lancashire was a county constituency of the House of Commons of the Parliament of the United Kingdom. It was represented by two Members of Parliament. The constituency was created by the Reform act of 1867 by the splitting of the South Lancashire constituency into new South-East  and South-West divisions.

The constituency was abolished by the Redistribution of Seats Act 1885, being divided into eight single member divisions of Bootle, Ince, Leigh, Newton, Ormskirk, St Helens, Southport and Widnes.

Boundaries

This constituency comprised the Lancashire hundred of West Derby except for the boroughs of Liverpool, Warrington and Wigan.

Members of Parliament

Constituency created (1868)

Elections

Elections in the 1860s

Elections in the 1870s

R. A. Cross sought re-election after being appointed as Home Secretary.

Charles Turner's death caused a by-election.

Elections in the 1880s

 

Cross was appointed Home Secretary, requiring a by-election.

References

Sources

History of Lancashire
Politics of Lancashire
History of Merseyside
Parliamentary constituencies in North West England (historic)
Constituencies of the Parliament of the United Kingdom established in 1868
Constituencies of the Parliament of the United Kingdom disestablished in 1885